Macrobathra vexillariata is a moth in the family Cosmopterigidae. It was described by Thomas Pennington Lucas in 1901. It is found in Australia, where it has been recorded from Queensland.

References

Macrobathra
Moths described in 1901